Mount Banahaw (also spelled as Banahao and Banájao) is an active complex volcano on Luzon in the Philippines. The three-peaked volcano is located at the boundary of Laguna and Quezon provinces. It is the highest mountain in both provinces and Calabarzon region, dominating the landscape for miles around.

The mountain is considered by many as a holy mountain, thus a bundok dambana, and is popular among pilgrims along with mountain climbers. It is located in a protected area known as Mounts Banahaw–San Cristobal Protected Landscape covering  of land.

Physical characteristics 
Prior to 1730, a lake occupied the summit crater of Mount Banahaw. The resulting flood destroyed the town of Sariaya, Quezon located below the mountain.

 Other peaks:
Mount San Cristobal (on the western slope)
Mount Banahaw de Lucban (at northeastern slope)
Buho Masalukot Domes (at southwestern slope)
Mount Mayabobo

 Maars:  Lake Dagatan/Gunao Lake and Lake Ticob
 Thermal Areas:

Tiaong-San Pablo hot/warm springs
Bakia warm/cold springs
Sampaloc warm springs
Mainit hot/warm springs
Cagsiay hot/warm springs

Importance to locals 

Banahaw is a custom pilgrimage site for locals, believed by many as a holy mountain, a spiritually-charged location. The mountain and its environs are considered sacred by local residents; the water from its sacred springs are deemed "holy water" for allegedly having beneficial qualities, issuing forth from locations called "puestos" or "holy sites". These sites are unique natural features composed not only of springs, but also caves, streams and boulders; with names with biblical allusions, and shrines erected in, on or around them. These locations were allegedly revealed to a man named Agripino Lontoc by the "Santong Boses" or the "Holy Voices", which also gave the names to these places way back during the Spanish colonial era. Another one of these mountains is the adjacent Mount Banahaw de Lucbán.

Banahaw is also a part of the Makiling-Banahaw Watershed, a reservation of the National Power Corporation (NAPOCOR) providing steam for power generation, as well as water source for domestic and industrial uses.

Hiking activity on Banahaw

The mountain is popular not only with pilgrims but also among mountain climbers being the closest over  mountain from Manila. Before 2004, hiking activity peaks during Holy Week each year, with climbers numbering to the thousands. At least four trails exist from Dolores, Sariaya, and other towns of Quezon located on its foothills. The most frequently used trails are the Cristalino and Tatlong Tangke, taking an average of 9 and 5 hours, respectively. These two trails originate from Barangay Kinabuhayan in Dolores, and meet near the summit, which is actually the rim of the Banahaw caldera. On the summit are viewpoints, labeled as Durungawan I, II, and III, which are the usual destination for pilgrims and hikers.  Other points of interest include the "Kuweba ng Diyos Ama" (Tagalog: Cave of God the Father) and the spring at Brgy. Kinabuhayan, said to have curative powers.

Pollution 
Due to incessant climbing activity the mountain trails have become littered with trash. In March 2004, the Department of Environment and Natural Resources ordered a 5-year suspension of hiking activity in the mountains, covering the Dolores and Sariaya trails. Reopening was delayed was then scheduled to March 2012, but was further extended to February 2015. Some sections of the mountain were reopened to hikers in 2019, and the mountain observed seasonal openings due to the mountain's religious significance, but most sections of the mountain still remain closed.

Endemic fauna 
Frogs endemic to Mount Banahaw include Platymantis banahao, Platymantis indeprensus, Platymantis montanus, Platymantis naomii, and Platymantis pseudodorsalis.

See also 
 Sacred mountains
 List of active volcanoes in the Philippines
 List of potentially active volcanoes in the Philippines
 List of inactive volcanoes in the Philippines
 List of protected areas of the Philippines
 Philippine Institute of Volcanology and Seismology
 List of Ultras of the Philippines

References

External links 

 Philippine Institute of Volcanology and Seismology, Mt Banahaw page
 "Mount Banahao, Philippines" on Peakbagger

Mountains of the Philippines
Volcanoes of Luzon
Complex volcanoes
Active volcanoes of the Philippines
Sacred mountains
Landforms of Quezon
Landforms of Laguna (province)
Stratovolcanoes of the Philippines